The Farmall B is a small one-plow row crop tractor produced by International Harvester under the Farmall brand from 1939 to 1947. It was derived from the popular Farmall A, but was offered with a narrow set of centerline front wheels instead of the A's wide front axle, allowing two-row cultivation. The operator's seat was offset to the right to allow better forward visibility.

Description and production
Styled by Raymond Loewy, it was one of International Harvester's "letter series", with 75,241 produced over the 8-year run. Mechanically identical to the Farmall A from which it was derived, B was rated for one  plow.

The B is equipped with the A's International Harvester C113 4-cylinder inline overhead valve engine, with a  displacement. The sliding-gear transmission contains five total gears: four forward and one reverse, transmitted via a portal axle. It was similar to the Farmall A, usingthe same engine moved back to the tractor's centerline, with a narrow front end, centrally placed, and with the seat offset to the right to preserve some of the A's cultivation visibility. The arrangement allowed two rows to be cultivated. As with other Farmall letter-series tractors, the design featured an integral frame and unitary construction, allowing entire assemblies to be replaced. Versions were produced for both gasoline and kerosene fuel. About 210,000 As and Bs were produced, selling for between $575 and $1,000.

The B was replaced by the Farmall C in 1948.

About 1500 BN tractors were produced.

Comparable products
Comparable products include the John Deere M, the Massey-Harris 20, and the Ferguson TE-20.

References

External links
NTTL Test #331 - Farmall B - Gasoline at the Nebraska Tractor Test Laboratory archive
NTTL Test #332 - Farmall B - Distillate at the Nebraska Tractor Test Laboratory archive

Farmall tractors
Vehicles introduced in 1939
Raymond Loewy